Amenia is a city in Cass County, North Dakota, United States. The population was 85 at the 2020 census. Amenia was founded in 1880.

The town is the site of several transmitter towers of Fargo broadcast television and radio stations.

Amenia was the home of North Dakota governor William L. Guy before and after holding office.

History
The town of Amenia traces its roots to a group of wealthy New England investors from the villages of Amenia, New York and Sharon, Connecticut which formed the Amenia and Sharon Land Company and, in July 1875, under the representation of Eben W. Chaffee, purchased  of land from the then bankrupt Northern Pacific Railroad. The stockholders' plan had been to develop the land enough to sell it to settlers, thus quickly realizing a return on the investors shares. However, taking notice of the success of the Cass-Cheney-Dalrymple bonanza farm near Casselton, North Dakota, and the exceptional fertility of the soil, Chaffee convinced the stockholders to hold the land and break the prairie sod for the production of wheat.  The company built a depot and, in 1881, a grain elevator in order to move their product to market.  Around them grew the village of Amenia. By the mid-1880s, the town had grown enough to require school services and to build a Congregational church. Chaffee was among its earliest residents and continued to be a central figure in the development of the town.

Geography

Climate
This climatic region is typified by large seasonal temperature differences, with warm to hot (and often humid) summers and cold (sometimes severely cold) winters.  According to the Köppen Climate Classification system, Amenia has a humid continental climate, abbreviated "Dfb" on climate maps.

Demographics

2010 census
As of the census of 2010, there were 94 people, 34 households, and 31 families residing in the city. The racial makeup of the city was 92.6% White, 3.2% Native American, and 4.3% from two or more races.

There were 34 households, of which 38.2% had children under the age of 18 living with them, 88.2% were married couples living together, 2.9% had a male householder with no wife present, and 8.8% were non-families. 8.8% of all households were made up of individuals, and 5.8% had someone living alone who was 65 years of age or older. The average household size was 2.76 and the average family size was 2.90.

The median age in the city was 35.3 years. 26.6% of residents were under the age of 18; 8.5% were between the ages of 18 and 24; 29.7% were from 25 to 44; 26.6% were from 45 to 64; and 8.5% were 65 years of age or older. The gender makeup of the city was 48.9% male and 51.1% female.

2000 census
As of the census of 2000, there were 89 people, 35 households, and 26 families residing in the city. The population density was 62.7 people per square mile (24.2/km2). There were 35 housing units at an average density of 24.7 per square mile (9.5/km2). The racial makeup of the city was 100.00% White.

There were 35 households, out of which 37.1% had children under the age of 18 living with them, 62.9% were married couples living together, 2.9% had a female householder with no husband present, and 25.7% were non-families. 25.7% of all households were made up of individuals, and 14.3% had someone living alone who was 65 years of age or older. The average household size was 2.54 and the average family size was 2.92.

In the city, the population was spread out, with 29.2% under the age of 18, 5.6% from 18 to 24, 23.6% from 25 to 44, 25.8% from 45 to 64, and 15.7% who were 65 years of age or older. The median age was 41 years. For every 100 females, there were 117.1 males. For every 100 females age 18 and over, there were 125.0 males.

The median income for a household in the city was $41,250, and the median income for a family was $51,250. Males had a median income of $31,250 versus $18,438 for females. The per capita income for the city was $16,462. There were no families and 2.3% of the population living below the poverty line, including no under eighteens and 15.4% of those over 64.

References

Cities in Cass County, North Dakota
Cities in North Dakota
Populated places established in 1880
1880 establishments in Dakota Territory